Kill the Last Romantic was an album released by Eastbourne-based English indie-rock 3-piece Easyworld in 2004.  It yielded two singles - "2nd Amendment" and "'Til the Day", though the label specified that the third single would have to be a newly written song, as there were no others on the album which the label deemed suitable for release, thereby leading to the release of the band's final single, "How Did It Ever Come to This?".

Though the source of their most successful single ("'Til the Day" entered the UK Singles Chart at #27), the album lacked both the critical acclaim afforded to their first full-length album ("This Is Where I Stand") and the commercial success anticipated by the Sony/BMG and much of the fan base alike.

Following the decision of Sony/BMG to terminate the band's contract, along with lead singer/guitarist David Ford's decision to pursue a solo career, the album was re-released in order to complete the band's record deal.

Track listing
 Kill the Last Romantic
 2nd Amendment
 Drive
 'Til the Day
 A Lot of Miles From Home
 Celebritykiller
 All I Can Remember
 Tonight
 When You Come Back, I Won't Be Here
 Saddest Song
 You Have Been Here
 Goodnight

A limited edition 2 disc version was also available containing the following alternate version bonus tracks:

 A Lot Of Miles From Home (At The Gates Of Hell)
 'til The Day (In The Saloon)
 Celebritykiller (At The Copa)
 All I Can Remember (At The Cooking Sherry Again)
 2nd Amendment (On The Soapbox)
 You Have Been Here (In A Spaghetti Western)
 When You Come Back I Won't Be Here (On A Casio)

References

2004 albums
Easyworld albums